Ugo Cavallero (20 September 1880 – 13 September 1943) was an Italian military commander before and during World War II. He was dismissed from his command due to his lacklustre performance, and was arrested upon the fall of Mussolini's regime. Cavallero was later freed by the Germans, but refused to collaborate and was found dead the following day.

Biography

Early life and career
Born in Casale Monferrato, Piedmont, Cavallero had a privileged childhood as a member of the Italian nobility. After attending military school, Cavallero was commissioned a second lieutenant in 1900. Cavallero later attended college and graduated in 1911, earning a degree in mathematics. A man of vast culture, Cavallero was fluent in both German and English. Still in the army, Cavallero fought in Libya in 1913, during the Italo-Turkish War, and was awarded a Bronze Medal of Military Valor.

In 1907, Cavallero was initiated in the regular Masonic Lodge "Dante Alighieri" of Turin, which was affiliated to the Grand Orient of Italy. Subsequently, he become a member of the Scottish Rite Serenenissima Gran Loggia d'Italia located in Rome, where on 15 August 1918 he received the 33rd and highest degree.

World War I
In 1915, Cavallero was transferred to the Italian Supreme Command. A skilled organizer and tactician, Cavallero became a brigadier general and chief of the Operations Office of the Italian Supreme Command in 1918. In this capacity, Cavallero was instrumental in forming plans that led to Italian victories at Piave and Vittorio Veneto during World War I. During his time as chief of the plan of Italian General Staff, he developed an antipathy with Pietro Badoglio, the Sottocapo di Stato Maggiore (vice chief of the staff) of the army.

Interwar period
Cavallero retired from the army in 1919 but later rejoined in 1925, at which time he became Benito Mussolini’s undersecretary of war. A committed fascist, Cavallero was made a senator in 1926 and in 1927 became a major general. After leaving the army for a second time, Cavallero became involved in business and diplomatic enterprises throughout the late 1920s and early 1930s.

Cavallero rejoined the army for the third and final time in 1937. Promoted to lieutenant general, he became commander of the combined Italian forces in Italian East Africa in 1938 and was made a full general in 1940.

World War II

After Italy entered World War II, on 6 December 1940 Cavallero replaced Pietro Badoglio as Chief of the Defence Staff. Shortly after his appointment, Cavallero was sent to command the Italian forces involved in the unsuccessful Greco-Italian War until the spring of 1941. While he managed to halt the Greek advance, Cavallero was unable to break the stalemate until the German intervention. In the meantime, his role as Chief of Staff was filled by General Alfredo Guzzoni.

On 15 and 19 May 1941 Cavallero, submitted proposals for the Stato Maggiores complete reorganization to Mussolini. This was implemented in June. The Stato Maggiore Generale was redesignated Comando Supremo, made more efficient and transformed from a mere advisory body into a true military high command. Under Cavallero, Comando Supremo maintained good relations with Oberbefehlshaber Süd, the command of German forces in Italy. Cavallero worked closely with German Field Marshal Albert Kesselring; however he had a rather conflicting relationship with Field Marshal Erwin Rommel, whose advance into Egypt after his success at the Battle of Gazala he opposed, advocating instead the planned invasion of Malta; his opinion, shared by Kesselring and Rintelen, was however discounted by Hitler and Mussolini. Cavallero was promoted to Marshal of Italy on 1 July 1942, soon after the promotion of Rommel to Field Marshal (largely to prevent Rommel from out-ranking him). Despite having a good grasp on the problems inherent to the war in the Mediterranean that Italy had to fight, his acquiescence to Mussolini's views (for example his insistence on augmenting the Italian contingent fighting on the Eastern Front) led to a fatal dispersion of Italy's meager resources.

In January 1943, after the definitive loss of the African campaign and the setbacks suffered by the Italian Army in Russia, Cavallero was dismissed and replaced by General Vittorio Ambrosio. In response to Cavallero's dismissal, members of the Fascist leadership like Galeazzo Ciano, openly hostile to him, openly expressed their satisfaction.

After Mussolini’s government was toppled by the King, the newly appointed Prime Minister Pietro Badoglio ordered the arrest of Cavallero. In a document written in his own defense, Cavallero claimed he had opposed Mussolini and his regime. After the Armistice of Cassibile in September 1943, the Germans freed him.  Kesselring offered Cavallero command of the forming armed forces of the Italian Social Republic, but discovery of the letter led some to question his loyalty.

Death
In the morning of 14 September 1943, he was found dead by a gunshot in the garden of a hotel in Frascati, after having dined and talked with Kesselring the night before. It is still up to debate whether he committed suicide or was assassinated by the Germans. It seems, however, that he firmly expressed his will to refuse to continue collaborating with the Germans.

Awards
Knight's Cross of the Iron Cross on 19 February 1942 as Generale di Corpo d'Armata and Chief of the Defence Staff of the Royal Italian Army.

See also
Royal Italian Army
Royal Italian Army (1940–1946)

Notes

References

External links
 

1880 births
1943 deaths
Field marshals of Italy
Greco-Italian War
Italian military personnel of the Italo-Turkish War
Italian military personnel of World War I
Italian military personnel killed in World War II
Italian soldiers
Italian untitled nobility
Members of the Senate of the Kingdom of Italy
People from Casale Monferrato
Recipients of the Bronze Medal of Military Valor
Recipients of the Knight's Cross of the Iron Cross
Deaths by firearm in Italy